The Hoya de Los Vicentes Solar Plant is a photovoltaic power station in Jumilla, Murcia in Spain. A total of 120,000 solar panels have been installed in the facility. The project generates energy equivalent to the annual consumption of 20,000 households.

See also 

 Photovoltaic power stations

References 

Photovoltaic power stations in Spain
Energy in the Region of Murcia